Jack Chapman Medica (October 5, 1914 – April 15, 1985) was an American competition swimmer, Olympic champion, and former world record-holder in two events.

At the 1936 Summer Olympics in Berlin, Germany, Medica won a gold medal in the 400-meter freestyle and set a new Olympic record at 4:44.5, joining Adolph Kiefer as the only American swimmers to win a gold medal at the Berlin Olympics.  He received a silver medal for his second-place performance in the 1,500-meter freestyle, recording a final time of 19:34.0.  Medica also received a second silver medal as a member of the runner-up U.S. team in the men's 4×200-meter freestyle relay, together with American teammates Ralph Flanagan, John Macionis and Paul Wolf.  The American relay team finished with a time of 9:03.0, behind the winning Japanese team.

After his retirement from competition swimming, brought on by World War II, Medica taught water survival for the U.S. Navy after his impaired vision kept him from enlisting.  He went on to teach at the University of Pennsylvania, where he also coached the Penn Quakers swimming and diving team.He also taught incoming freshmen to swim, notoriously belaying their fears by saying "any damn fool can swim."

During his elite career, Medica won 10 Amateur Athletic Union (AAU) individual national titles and set 11 world records in distances ranging from 200 meters to one mile.  His 200-meter freestyle record set in 1935 stood for nine years, and his 400-meter freestyle record of 1934 stood for seven years.  He was inducted into the International Swimming Hall of Fame as an "Honor Swimmer" in 1966.

See also
 List of members of the International Swimming Hall of Fame
 List of Olympic medalists in swimming (men)
 List of University of Pennsylvania people
 List of University of Washington people
 World record progression 200 metres freestyle
 World record progression 400 metres freestyle

References

1914 births
1985 deaths
American male freestyle swimmers
World record setters in swimming
Medalists at the 1936 Summer Olympics
Olympic gold medalists for the United States in swimming
Olympic silver medalists for the United States in swimming
Columbia Lions coaches
Penn Quakers coaches
Swimmers from Seattle
Swimmers at the 1936 Summer Olympics
Washington Huskies men's swimmers
United States Navy personnel of World War II